The Fifth Australian Recording Industry Association Music Awards (generally known as the ARIA Music Awards or simply The ARIAS) was held on 25 March 1991 at the Darling Harbour Convention Centre in Sydney. International host Bob Geldof was assisted by presenters to distribute 24 awards. There were live performances but the awards were not televised and the ceremony was noted for its three-hours plus length with Gary Morris, manager of Midnight Oil providing a 20-minute acceptance speech.

In addition to previous categories, "Lifetime Achievement Award" was created and first awarded posthumously to record producer and Albert Productions label owner, Ted Albert (who died in November 1990); an "Outstanding Achievement Award" was presented to Midnight Oil. The ARIA Hall of Fame inducted four artists: Don Burrows, Peter Dawson, Glenn Shorrock and Billy Thorpe.

Ceremony details

Host Bob Geldof found the three-hour plus ceremony to be interminable and threatened to walk out. Midnight Oil's manager Gary Morris provided the longest acceptance speech of the night at 20 minutes. According to music journalist, Anthony O'Grady, "[he] covered a gambit of topics including the downfall of Western Civilization." Morris later stated that as the ceremony was not televised he decided to speak his mind. Billy Thorpe's speech on his Hall of Fame induction, "travelled almost as long ... [he] remembered friends and supporters throughout a 30-year career." According to ARIA spokesperson, Peter Rix, "It was my worst ARIA nightmare come true." Music commentator, Molly Meldrum, disapproved of Morris' speech length—they had already had a fracas at the ARIAs in 1988—Meldrum provided an even longer acceptance speech in 1993.

Presenters and performers 

The ARIA Awards ceremony was hosted by Bob Geldof. Presenters and performers were:

Awards

The winners are listed in bold.

ARIA Awards

Album of the Year 
Midnight Oil – Blue Sky Mining
The Black Sorrows – Harley and Rose
John Farnham – Chain Reaction
INXS – X
Margaret Urlich – Safety in Numbers
Single of the Year 
Absent Friends – "I Don't Want to Be With Nobody But You"
Divinyls – "I Touch Myself"
John Farnham – "That's Freedom"
Hunters and Collectors – "Throw Your Arms Around Me"
Midnight Oil – "Blue Sky Mine"
Highest Selling Album 
John Farnham – Chain Reaction
Highest Selling Single 
Craig McLachlan & Check 1-2 – "Mona"
Best Group 
Midnight Oil – Blue Sky Mining
Boom Crash Opera – Look! Listen!! 
The Black Sorrows – Harley and Rose
Hunters and Collectors – "Throw Your Arms Around Me"
INXS – X
Best Female Artist 
Wendy Matthews – Émigré
Kate Ceberano – Like Now
Grace Knight – Come In Spinner
Jenny Morris – "Piece of My Heart"
Margaret Urlich – Safety in Numbers
Best Male Artist 
John Farnham – Chain Reaction
Peter Blakeley – Harry's Café De Wheels
Jimmy Barnes – Two Fires
Daryl Braithwaite – Rise
Stephen Cummings – "Hell (You've Put Me Through)"
Best New Talent 
Archie Roach – Charcoal Lane
Doug Anthony Allstars – Icon
Sea Stories – Miller's Pond
Mary-Jo Starr – Too Many Movies
The Screaming Jets – "C'mon"
Breakthrough Artist – Album
Margaret Urlich – Safety in Numbers
Absent Friends – Here's Looking Up Your Address
Wendy Matthews – Émigré
Archie Roach – Charcoal Lane
Southern Sons – Southern Sons
Breakthrough Artist – Single
Wendy Matthews – "Token Angels"
Absent Friends – "I Don't Want to Be With Nobody But You"
Archie Roach – "Took the Children Away"
Seven Stories – "Sleeping Through Another War"
Southern Sons – "Heart in Danger"
Best Country Album 
James Blundell – Hand It Down
Luhrs & Crawford – Midnight In Paradise
Norma Murphy – Closer Now
Slim Dusty – Coming Home
Various Artists – Breaking Ground – New Directions in Country Music
Best Independent Release 
The Killjoys – Ruby
Blue Ruin – I'm Gonna Smile
Girl Monstar – "Joe Cool"
Roaring Jack – Through the Smoke of Innocence
Various Artists – Rockin Bethlehem: The Second Coming
Best Indigenous Release 
Archie Roach – Charcoal Lane
Coloured Stone – Crazy Mind
Various Artists – Australia All Over Macca's No. 4
Various Artists – From the Bush
Wild Pumpkins At Midnight – Little Victories
Best Adult Contemporary Album 
Vince Jones and Grace Knight – Come in Spinner
Andrew Pendlebury – Zing... Went To The Strings
Marc Hunter – Night & Day
Original Cast Recording – Paris
Tommy Emmanuel – Dare to Be Different
Best Comedy Release 
John Clarke & Bryan Dawe – Great Interviews of the Twentieth Century
The 12th Man – The 12th Man Again
The D-Generation – The Breakfast Tapes
Doug Anthony All Stars – Icon
HG Nelson & Roy Slaven – Wicket to Wicket

Fine Arts Awards
Best Jazz Album
Clarion Fracture Zone – Blue Shift
The Last Straw – The Last Straw
Dale Barlow – Horn
Paul Grabowsky – The Moon and You
James Morrison – Snappy Doo
Best Classical Album 
Stuart Challender, Sydney Symphony Orchestra – Sculthorpe: Orchestral Works
David Helfgott – David Helfgott
Geoffrey Simon, Melbourne Symphony Orchestra – Percy Grainger: Orchestral Works
Hartley Newnham & Nicholas Routley – Hermit of Green Light
The Choir of Christ Church St Laurence – Victoria: Missa Surge Propera
Best Children's Album 
Robyn Archer – Mrs Bottle's Burp
Agro – The Agro Album
Don Spencer – Let's Have Fun
Glynn Nicholas & The Funky Fossils – The Dinosaur Album
John Williamson – JW's Family Album
Best Original Soundtrack / Cast / Show Recording 
Jon English and David Mackay – Paris
Brian May – Bloodmoon
Bruce Smeaton – Wendy Cracked a Walnut
Michael Askill & Nigel Westlake – Road to Xanadu – The Genius That Was China
Vince Jones & Grace Knight – Come in Spinner

Artisan Awards
Song of the Year 
 Phil Buckle, John Farnham, Ross Fraser – "Burn for You" (John Farnham)
Joe Camilleri and Nick Smith – "Harley + Rose" (The Black Sorrows)
Roger Mason – "Token Angels" (Wendy Matthews)
Midnight Oil – "Blue Sky Mine" (Midnight Oil)
Mark Seymour – "Turn a Blind Eye" (Hunters and Collectors)
Producer of the Year
 Ross Fraser – "That's Freedom" – John Farnham, "Heart in Danger" – Southern Sons, "The Love We Make" – Girl Overboard, "Jukebox in Siberia" and "Tall Timber" – Skyhooks
 Martin Armiger – "Sophisticated Lady", "The Man I Love"/"I've Got You Under My Skin"/"She's Not There"/"Nature Boy" – Grace Knight/Vince Jones/Crowded House/Kate Ceberano
 Ollie Olsen – "Monday Night by Satellite" – Max Q
 Jeffrey Burstin, Joe Camilleri  Peter Luscombe –"Harley + Rose", "Angel Street", "Never Let Me Go", "Hold It up to the Mirror" – The Black Sorrows
 Ricky Fataar – "Token Angels", "Woman's Gotta Have It" – Wendy Matthews
Engineer of the Year 
 David Nicholas – "Blue Sky Mine", "Forgotten Years", "King of the Mountain", "Bedlam Bridge" – Midnight Oil, "Suicide Blonde", "Disappear" – INXS, "Piece of My Heart" – Jenny Morris
 "Only You" – Bang the Drum
 "Mona", "Amanda", "I Almost Felt Like Crying" – Craig McLachlan & Check 1-2
 Doug Brady – "Strong as Steel", "I Need Your Body", "The Machine's Breaking Down" – Tina Arena, "Jukebox in Siberia" – Skyhooks, "Burn for You", "That's Freedom" – John Farnham, "Heart in Danger", "Always and Ever" – Southern Sons
 Tony Espie – "Token Angels" – Wendy Matthews, "Somebody to Love" – Bughouse
Best Video 
 Claudia Castle – "Blue Sky Mine" – Midnight Oil
 "Permanent Friend" – Girl Overboard
 "Suicide Blonde" – INXS
 "That's Freedom" – John Farnham
 "Dr Dynamite" – Mighty Big Crime
Best Cover Art 
Livingstone Clarke, Midnight Oil – Midnight Oil – Blue Sky Mining
Timothy Eames – Collected Works – Hunters & Collectors
Iva Davies and David Barnes – Code Blue – Icehouse
Jon Quinn – Chain Reaction – John Farnham
Capitol Art / Peter Blakeley – Harry's Café De Wheels – Peter Blakeley

Achievement awards

Lifetime Achievement Award

Ted Albert

Outstanding Achievement Award

Midnight Oil

ARIA Hall of Fame inductees

The Hall Of Fame inductees were:
Don Burrows
Peter Dawson
Billy Thorpe
Glenn Shorrock

Notes

References

External links
ARIA Awards official website
List of 1991 winners

1991 music awards
1991 in Australian music
ARIA Music Awards